Boylston Street is a major east–west thoroughfare in the city of Boston, Massachusetts. The street begins in Boston's Chinatown neighborhood, forms the southern border of the Boston Public Garden and Boston Common, runs through Back Bay, and ends in Boston's Fenway neighborhood.

Name 
As early as 1722, Boylston Street, then a short road on the outskirts of the town of Boston, was known as Frogg Lane or Frog Lane. It was later renamed for Ward Nicholas Boylston (1747–1828), a philanthropist and  benefactor of Harvard University. Boylston, who was a descendant of Zabdiel Boylston, was born in Boston and spent much of his life in it. Boylston Market, and the town of Boylston, Massachusetts, were also named after him.

Route
From east to west, Boston's Boylston Street begins at the intersection of Essex Street and Washington Street in Boston's Chinatown neighborhood at the edge of Downtown Boston. It is a one-way street running west-to-east from Tremont Street to Washington Street. West of Tremont Street, it runs along the southern edge of the Boston Common and the Boston Public Garden. West of Arlington Street, it is a one-way street running eastbound, forming a major traffic artery and commercial street through the Back Bay neighborhood, where it passes along the north side of Copley Square. West of the Back Bay neighborhood, the street intersects with the Fenway to form the northern boundary of the Back Bay Fens. Here it intersects with the Charlesgate viaduct, connecting to Storrow Drive. West of this intersection, the street carries traffic in both directions as a two-way, six-lane street through Boston's Fenway neighborhood. It runs through high-rise, mixed-use buildings one block south of Fenway Park before ending at the intersection of Park Drive, Brookline Avenue, and the Riverway.

The MIT Rogers Building was at 497 Boylston Street when MIT had its original campus in Boston, before it moved to Cambridge in 1916. A plaque on the building serves as a commemoration.

On April 15, 2013, 666 Boylston Street was the scene of two explosive detonations that occurred during the running of the 117th Boston marathon, which killed 3 people and wounded at least 264.

Landmarks

 500 Boylston Street – a postmodern office building
 941–955 Boylston Street – houses a fire station, and is also now home to the Institute of Contemporary Art, part of Boston Architectural College
 Back Bay Fens
 Berklee College of Music
 Boston Common
 Boston Public Garden
 Boston Public Library
 Copley Square
 Emerson College – several buildings are located along the street across from Boston Common
 Hynes Convention Center
 Massachusetts Historical Society – 1154 Boylston Street
 Old South Church
 Saint Clement's Eucharistic Shrine
 Saint Francis House – a former Boston Edison Electric Illuminating Company building
 Steinert Hall
 Trinity Church

Transportation
The MBTA Green Line follows Boylston Street in Back Bay, with stops at Boylston, Arlington, Copley, and Hynes Convention Center.

See also 
Parcel 15 Tower

References

External links

Streets in Boston
Economy of Boston